The Russian Mountains were a predecessor of roller coasters.

Russian Mountains may also refer to:
Russian Mountains, a subrange of the Salmon Mountains in the Russian Wilderness, California, USA
Russian Mountains (Alaska), a mountain range in Alaska, USA
List of mountains and hills of Russia